Village at Pigeon Lake is a hamlet in central Alberta, Canada within the County of Wetaskiwin No. 10.

The hamlet is home to an eponymous resort and commercial development that consists of a grocery store, two clothing stores, a gift shop, several restaurants, an inn, spa, liquor store, and other tourist amenities.

Demographics 
Village at Pigeon Lake recorded a population of 77 in the 2006 Census of Population conducted by Statistics Canada.

See also 
List of communities in Alberta
List of hamlets in Alberta

References 

Hamlets in Alberta
County of Wetaskiwin No. 10